The country calling code +970 is reserved for telephone numbers in the State of Palestine.

This code is mainly used when calling from Arab countries to places under the jurisdiction of the Palestinian Authority (including the Gaza Strip). The telecommunication system in the West Bank and the Gaza Strip is considerably dependent on the Israeli infrastructure, therefore, from most countries, dialing +972 would often be the better option to access phone numbers in the Palestinian territories. In some cases, when the number was allocated directly by an Israeli company, this would be the only option. However, from many Arab or Muslim countries that block the Israeli access code, dialing 970 is the only option to access the Palestinian telecommunication system. Syria is currently the only country that blocks both 972 and 970 access codes. Lebanon lifted the ban on the 970 code in July 2008 but still blocks the 972 code.

Palestinians use the Israeli telecommunication infrastructure either directly or through the Palestinian Paltel company, which allocates numbers reserved for it by the Israeli Ministry of Communications.
The 059 prefix is reserved exclusively for the Palestinian Jawwal cellular communication company (a subsidiary of Paltel), and the 056 prefix is similarly reserved for the Wataniya Telecom company. Note that these prefixes had been used in the past as Israeli internal dialing prefixes, but were replaced or merged with other dialing codes, and reintroduced for the exclusive use of the Palestinian telecommunication system.

Numbering system

International
 00 XXX XX XXX XXXX - International dialing

West Bank

North West Bank
 04 24X XXXX  - Jenin Governorate
 09 25X XXXX  - Tubas Governorate
 09 26X XXXX  - Tulkarm Governorate
 09 23X XXXX  - Nablus Governorate
 09 29X XXXX  - Qalqilya Governorate
 09 25X XXXX  - Salfit Governorate

Central West Bank
 02 29X XXXX  - Ramallah and Al-Bireh Governorate
 02 22X XXXX  - Jericho Governorate
 02 23X XXXX  - Jerusalem Governorate

South West Bank
 02 27X XXXX  - Bethlehem Governorate
 02 22X XXXX  - Hebron Governorate

Gaza Strip
 08 24X XXXX  - North Gaza Governorate
 08 28X XXXX  - Gaza Governorate
 08 26X XXXX  - Gaza Governorate, Tall al-Hawa
 08 20X XXXX  - Khan Yunis Governorate
 08 25X XXXX  - Deir al-Balah Governorate
 08 21X XXXX  - Rafah Governorate

Cellular
 059 XXX XXXX - Mobile Jawwal
 056 XXX XXXX - Mobile Wataniya

Services
 100 - Police
 101 - Ambulance
 102 - Fire

Toll
 1 700 - Business Toll
 1 800 - Toll Free

See also
 Telecommunications in the Palestinian territories
 Telephone numbers in Israel

References

Palestinian territories
Economy of the State of Palestine
Telecommunications in the State of Palestine